The Pavillon Le Corbusier is a Swiss art museum in Zürich-Seefeld at Zürichhorn dedicated to the work of the Swiss architect Le Corbusier. In 1960 Heidi Weber had the vision to establish a museum designed by Le Corbusier – this building should exhibit his works of art in an ideal environment created by the architect himself in the then Centre Le Corbusier or Heidi Weber Museum. In April 2014 the building and museum went over to the city of Zürich, and was renamed in May 2016.

Location 
The building is located on the Zürichsee lake shore nearby Zürichhorn in the Seefeld quarter. It can be reached by foot (20 minutes from Bellevueplatz–Sechseläutenplatz) or by public transportation: Trams 2 and 4 and bus line 33 to stops Höschgasse or Fröhlichstrasse, or bus lines 912 and 916 from Bellevue to Chinagarten, or by the Limmat boats operated by the Zürichsee-Schifffahrtsgesellschaft (ZSG) towards Zürichhorn.

Centre Le Corbusier building 
It is the last building designed by Le Corbusier marking a radical change of his achievement of using concrete and stone, framed in steel and glass, in the 1960s created as a signpost for the future. Le Corbusier made intensive use of prefabricated steel elements combined with multi-coloured enamelled plates fitted to the central core, and above the complex he designed a 'free-floating' roof to keep the house protected from the rain and the sun.

The most prominent architectural element, the roof, consists of two square parts, each side having a surface of 12 x . The total ground surface measures 12 x , consisting of welded metal sheets and having a weight of 40 tons. The roof was prefabricated and thereafter, in the biggest possible units, transported to the building site, where it was assembled on the ground. The two finally welded parts of the roof were then lifted to their final height by a crane and fixed on the pillars. With the frame thus completed, the construction process benefited from the independent roof protection which was at that time already in its proper place. It consists of cubes 2.26 x  which were assembled on the site. Walls, windows, ceilings and floors were then screwed onto the steel frame. The walls consist of enamelled panels measuring  x . The placing of these enamel panels was planned according to a particular rhythmic system. Finally, the entire building complex was placed on a concrete ground floor. The building has two floors – five single-storied and one double-storied rooms. When constructing the building complex, more than 20,000 bolts were used.

Museum 
The Centre Le Corbusier can be considered a Gesamtkunstwerk, i.e. a total work of art, and reflects the harmonic unity of Le Corbusier's architecture, sculptures, paintings, furniture designs and his writings, which is unique and possibly the only one such existing structure in the world. In 1968/69 Jürg Gasser's comprehensive photographic survey related to Chandigarh was exhibited; the Zürich photographer had visited the new capital of India's constituent state of Punjab on behalf of Heidi Weber. While Heidi Weber removed Le Corbusier's  sculptures, designs and mementos in mid-May 2016 for personal reasons, the city of Zürich as the new owner replaced these items from others sources respectively collections.

History 
In 1960 Le Corbusier was mandated by Heidi Weber, a Swiss art collector and patron, to conceive a public exhibition building. One year later, the first drawings for a building to be constructed in concrete were presented, in 1962 the concept was changed to a steel building. Two years later the construction was started. In 1965 Le Corbusier died, and on 15 July 1967, the Centre Le Corbusier was officially inaugurated. On 13 May 1964 the city government presented the plot of land for the museum in construction law for 50 years free of charge. Therefore, on 13 May 2014 the building became the property of the city of Zürich represented by the newly created public Heidi Weber Foundation – Centre Le Corbusier. The board of trustees is represented by the city as well as by Mrs Heidi Weber: I welcome this solution. It helps me to be able to enter the house in new hands.

By April 2016 the Heidi Weber Foundation – Centre Le Corbusier preserved the last building designed by Le Corbusier, organized exhibitions, and collected and documents related to the architect's work. In an interview end of May 2016, Heidi Weber stated that she's disappointed that the city of Zürich renamed the museum and building in Pavillon Le Corbusier, while ignoring the well-established name Heidi Weber Museum. Otherwise, municipal officials stated that the museum's name Centre Le Corbusier – Heidi Weber Museum was damned by Mrs Weber. In mid-May 2016 Heidi Weber vacated the museum and removed images, sketches, sculptures, tapestry, furniture, the original models of the building, and an archive of Corbusier's letters and notes, after negotiations with the city of Zürich failed from her perspective. An agreement with Heidi Weber had failed at their price expectations, the mayor's office annotated. Weber has pursued legal action to have her name restored to the museum.

Mid-2016 the museum was administered by the cultural department of the city of Zürich, after the establishment of a foundation no longer was to realize, according to the city's officials, due to changes in the law. While a plaque at the museum's entrance points Weber's merits and hold the gratitude of the city of Zürich, Weber negotiates with the cities of Shanghai and Santiago de Chile on the opening of a Corbusier-house, her son complemented in the interview end of May 2016. The museum was run by Eva Wagner from 2014 to 2017. During this period, there were four temporary exhibitions on the work and personality of Le Corbusier, as well as works by the Swiss architect. Since then, the pavilion has attracted a total of around 35,000 visitors in the summer months. On 1 October 2017 the museum closed and the interim operation ended.

Reorganisation and renovation 
The listed pavilion will be renovated until spring 2019. From then on, the Museum für Gestaltung will operate the pavilion. A jury of experts unanimously chose the concept of the museum in September 2017 because it convinced with an "attractive, tailor-made programme for exhibitions and accompanying events". In December 2016, the city parliament had approved operating subsidies of CHF 500,000 per annum for the new sponsorship for the years 2019 to 2022. In addition, the city will be exempted from rent of CHF 220,000 per annum.

Cultural heritage of national importance 
The museum is listed in the Swiss inventory of cultural property of national and regional significance as a Class A object of national importance.

Legacy 
The Pavillon Le Corbusier in Zürich built in 1967 was copied in Chandigarh in India in 1967 as exactly the same building but in different material. Concrete was used in Chandigarh instead of steel and glass. The building was called the Government Museum and Art Gallery, designed by Le Corbusier & Pierre Jeanneret along with the associated architects Manmohan Nath Sharma and Shi Dutt Sharma, 1960–1962.

Literature 
 Heidi Weber – 50 Years Ambassador for Le Corbusier 1958–2008. Birckhäuser Publisher, 2009, .

References

External links 

 Pavillon Le Corbusier on the website of the city of Zürich 
 The Heidi Weber House of Le Corbusier''

Art museums and galleries in Zurich
Biographical museums in Switzerland
District 8 of Zürich
Architecture museums
Art museums established in 1967
Buildings and structures completed in 1967
1967 establishments in Switzerland
Cultural property of national significance in the canton of Zürich
International Style (architecture)
Le Corbusier buildings
Modernist architecture in Switzerland
Le Corbusier